Julius Vitringa Coulon (9 August 1824 – 14 July 1878) was a Dutch politician and colonial administrator who served as commander of several forts on the Dutch Gold Coast and, upon returning to the Netherlands, as mayor of the town of Sloten and the municipality of Hennaarderadeel.

Biography 
Julius Vitringa Coulon was born to Aemilius Vitringa Coulon en Nieske Zeper. Both of his grandfathers, dr.  and  served as mayor of Leeuwarden. In 1853, Vitringa Coulon was installed assistant on the Dutch Gold Coast, where he subsequently served as commander of Fort Batenstein at Butre, Fort Crêvecoeur at Accra, and Fort St. Anthony at Axim. In May 1866, Vitringa Coulon retired from service on the Dutch Gold Coast and returned to the Netherlands, where he settled down in Boxmeer.

In 1869, Vitringa Coulon married Elisabeth Johanna van Hien (1840-1918), sister of his colleague Carel van Hien, in Boxmeer. Vitringa Coulon was appointed mayor of Sloten in 1874 and a year later appointed mayor of Hennaarderadeel.

Map of the District of Axim 

While Vitringa Coulon served as commander of Fort St. Anthony at Axim, the Dutch colonial administration ordered all commanders to draw a map of the area around the fort, as part of an administrative reform aimed at establishing suzerainty over the peoples near the fort. The map Vitringa Coulon drew is kept at the Nationaal Archief in The Hague.

References 

1824 births
1878 deaths
Dutch Gold Coast people
Mayors in Friesland
People from Leeuwarden